About Safety is a children's educational television program which originated in 1972. It was produced by the Mississippi Authority for Educational Television. In the 3 to 6 minute shorts, marionettes, most notably Clyde Frog, taught children about safety and first aid. Mischievous Clyde has a distinctive, high-pitched voice, and would get himself into various troubles. The show illustrated dangers, ranging from traffic, guns, and tornadoes. About Safety ran for 47 episodes and the shows were quite successful. MAETV syndicated them throughout the United States.

The character of Clyde Frog later appeared in another MAETV show, Clyde Frog Show, which taught children about self-esteem, feelings, and attitudes, and ran for ten episodes. An animated version of Clyde Frog has been featured in several episodes of South Park as a favorite toy of Eric Cartman.

Episodes of the show failed to include a copyright notice and were released before 1978, so are therefore in the public domain in the United States.

Educational goals
The current Mississippi Public Broadcasting School Resource Guide summarizes the goals of About Safety: "Clyde Frog and his puppet friends learn school safety, fire safety and first aid. The open-ended lessons are designed to help elementary children develop concepts of safe living. The puppets dramatize situations that explain the need for safety rules, and demonstrate safe and unsafe
activities."

By grade level, the specific goals are: Kindergarten: Demonstrate safe behavior in daily activities.
First grade: Explain the importance of first aid and emergency assistance; explain ways of preventing accidents; explain the importance of safety on the school bus and playground.
Second grade: Explain the potential results of accidents.
Third grade: Identify the safety procedures to follow in case of natural or man-made disasters.

Episodes
There are 47 episodes total, each 3 to 6 minutes long. The episodes, as grouped roughly by subject into 16 groups by MAETV, are:

Group 101
 Clyde Learns School Bus Rules
 Clyde Waits for the School Bus
 Clyde Gets off the School Bus

Group 102
 Clyde Walks to School
 Clyde Walks from School
 Clyde Finds His Way to School

Group 103
 Clyde on the Safety Patrol
 Clyde Explores the Way to School
 Clyde at the Bus Stop

Group 104
 Clyde on the Playground
 Clyde Learns About Classroom Safety
 Clyde Gets in Trouble at School

Group 105
 Clyde on the Safety Council
 Clyde Learns Responsibility
 Clyde Walks the Halls

Group 106
 Clyde Sets an Example
 Clyde Learns About Traffic Signals
 Clyde Learns About Reflective Tape

Group 107
 Clyde Goes Trick-or-Treating
 Clyde on Halloween
 Clyde Reports His Accident

Group 108
 Clyde at Home
 Clyde Gets a Taste of Kitchen Safety
 Clyde Discovers Bathroom Safety

Group 109
 Clyde Learns About Fire Safety
 Clyde Learns About Clothing Fires
 Clyde Learns About Gun Safety

Group 110
 Clyde Learns About Fireworks
 Clyde and the Firecracker
 Clyde Learns About First Aid

Group 111
 Clyde Learns About Winter Safety
 Clyde Learns About Safe Sledding
 Clyde Learns About Baby-sitting

Group 112
 Clyde Visits the Farm
 Clyde Rides in a Car
 Clyde Reads Traffic Signs

Group 113
 Clyde Takes a Hike
 Clyde on the Railroad Tracks
 Clyde Goes Hitchhiking

Group 114
 Clyde and the Tornado
 Clyde Flies a Kite
 Clyde Learns About Water Safety

Group 115
 Clyde Takes a Swim
 Clyde Learns About Germs
 Clyde Examines the Medicine Cabinet 

Group 116
 Clyde Tests His Bicycle
 Clyde Enjoys Bicycle Safety

Summaries

The Hawaii Department Of Education website lists summaries for 19 of the 47 episodes, as follows:

Clyde learns School Bus Rules, A bus accident happens when Clyde Frog and his puppet friends ignore safety rules.

Clyde Gets off the School Bus, Clyde Frog and his puppet friends participate in a school bus safety contest.

Clyde Walks to School, Clyde Frog and his puppet friend Andy walk to school unsafely.

Clyde on the Safety Patrol, Clyde Frog panics when faced with school patrol responsibilities.

Clyde Walks from School, Clyde Frog is the subject of a TV special on walking home safely.

Clyde learns About Reflective Tape, Clyde Frog stumbles over his bicycle in the dark.

Clyde learns About Fire Safety, Clyde Frog learns fire safety tips when his toy is ignited by a campfire.

Clyde learns About Classroom Safety, Clyde Frog reads a story about school accidents.

Clyde on the Playground, Clyde Frog ends up in the hospital after playing baseball unsafely.

Clyde Goes Trick-or-Treating, Clyde Frog wears a dark costume with a poorly fitting mask.

Clyde Enjoys Bicycle Safety, Clyde Frog learns important safety tips while competing in a marathon bike rally.

Clyde Rides in a Car, Clyde Frog breaks safety rules and gets into trouble during a car ride with his father.

Clyde Gets in Trouble at School, Clyde Frog learns that he must practice safety, not just know the rules.

Clyde learns About First Aid, Clyde Frog learns first aid for bleeding and sprained ankles while reading about one of his ancestors.

Clyde Takes a Hike, While hiking with his puppet friends, Clyde Frog learns to recognize poison ivy the hard way.

Clyde Flies a Kite, Clyde Frog and his friend Andy learns from a book character how to fly a kite safely.

Clyde learns About Germs, Clyde Frog and his friend Max look at germs through a microscope and learn how to care for cuts and bleeding.

Clyde at Home, After several minor accidents, Clyde Frog learns that safety also must be practiced at home.

Clyde learns About Gun Safety, Clyde Frog almost loses his life when his friend Andy plays with his father's real gun.

Notes

External links

 
 

1972 American television series debuts
1973 American television series endings
1970s American children's television series
American children's education television series
American television shows featuring puppetry
English-language television shows
Health education television series
PBS original programming
Safety
Television series about frogs